Alfredo Pitto (25 May 1906 – 16 October 1976) was an Italian footballer who played as a midfielder. He competed in the 1928 Summer Olympics, winning a bronze medal in the tournament.

Club career
Pitto played for several Italian clubs throughout his career, winning the 1928–29 Divisione Nazionale title with Bologna.

International career
Pitto was a member of the Italy national football team that won the bronze medal in the 1928 Summer Olympics football tournament; he also won two editions of the Central European International Cup with Italy (1927–30 and 1933–35), as well as being runner-up (1931-32).

Honours

Club
Bologna
 Italian Football Championship: 1928–29

International 
Italy
 Central European International Cup: 1927-30, 1933-35
 Central European International Cup: Runner-up: 1931-32
 Summer Olympics: Bronze 1928

References

External links
 
 
 
 

1906 births
1976 deaths
Italian footballers
Footballers at the 1928 Summer Olympics
Olympic footballers of Italy
Olympic bronze medalists for Italy
Italy international footballers
Serie A players
U.S. Livorno 1915 players
Bologna F.C. 1909 players
ACF Fiorentina players
Inter Milan players
Olympic medalists in football
Medalists at the 1928 Summer Olympics
Association football midfielders
Atletico Piombino players